Analcina is a monotypic genus of moths of the Cybalomiinae subfamily of the Crambidae. It contains only one species, Analcina penthica, which is found in Australia, where it has been recorded from Queensland.

References

Cybalomiinae
Moths of Australia
Crambidae genera
Monotypic moth genera
Taxa named by Alfred Jefferis Turner